Gedō (外道), also romanized simply as Gedo or Gedou, is a Japanese rock band. They were formed in 1973. The band split a first time in 1976, and then reformed and split again several times. Their first self-titled album is highly acclaimed in their home country, having been featured on Rolling Stone's 100 greatest Japanese albums (N°24) and Julian Cope's Japrocksampler, among other lists.

Members
 Hideto Kanou: vocals, guitar. He is the central member of Gedō.
 Aoki Masayuki: vocals, bass guitar. Founding member, he left in 1981.
 Nakano Ryoichi: vocals, drums. Founding member, he left the band but returned for the 2002-2003 reformation.
 Matsumoto Shinji: vocals, bass guitar. He joined the band in 2002.
 Soul Toul: vocals, drums. He joined the band in 1991, and re-joined in 2010.

Discography
 Gedō (外道) (20 September 1974)
 Gedō Live in Sound of Hawaii Studio (外道ライブ・イン・サウンド・オブ・ハワイ・スタジオ) (1 April 1975)
 JUST GEDO (June 1975)
 Shide LIVE (拾得LIVE) (November 1975)
 POWER CUT (April 1981)
 Mooning (1982)
 Gedō LIVE 〜Mihappyou Kaisan Concert 1976.10.16 (外道LIVE 〜未発表・解散コンサート1976.10.16) (April 1991)
 One, Two (21 July 1991)
 DIE FOR YOU (1993)
 Kaze Densetsu Bukkomi no Taku ～Yasei no Tenshitachi～ (疾風列伝 特攻の拓～野生の天使たち～) (1995)
 Gedō SINGLES (1973-1975) (外道SINGLES(1973-1975)) (1998)
 水金地火木土天回明 〜外道・秘蔵音源集 その壱 (30 November 2002)
 水金地火木土天回明 〜外道・秘蔵音源集 その弐 (30 November 2002)
 Best Gedō (ベスト外道) (24 July 2003)
 Kyou Netsu no Machida Police '74 (狂熱の町田ポリス'74) (24 July 2003)
 Kyoto Shide -Kanzenban- (京都拾得-完全版-) (24 July 2003)
 1975 -Yahon Kyo no Aloha- (1975 -野音狂のアロハ- (24 July 2003)
 NφW (26 September 2003)
 1976 Sayonara Nippon (1976 さよならニッポン) (27 November 2003)
 Saigo no Mandala Yaneura Densetsu '76 (最期の曼荼羅屋根裏伝説 '76) (27 November 2003)
 Jitsuroku Hitman Hokkai No Tora -Boukyou- ORIGINAL SOUNDTRACK (実録ヒットマン 北海の虎 -望郷- ORIGINAL SOUNDTRACK) (27 November 2003)
 Itsumo no Tokorode Blues Wo〜LIVE IN CROCODILE (いつものところでブルースを〜LIVE IN CROCODILE) (23 May 2015)
 Tamashii no Sakebi (魂の叫び) (6 November 2013)

External links
 Official site

Japanese rock music groups
Musical groups established in 1973